In computing, a stylus (or stylus pen) is a small pen-shaped instrument whose tip position on a computer monitor can be detected. It is used to draw, or make selections by tapping. While devices with touchscreens such as newer computers, mobile devices (smartphones and personal digital assistants), game consoles, and graphics tablets can usually be operated with a fingertip, a stylus provides more accurate and controllable input. The stylus has the same function as a mouse or touchpad as a pointing device; its use is commonly called pen computing.

History 
The earliest computer-related usage for a stylus was in 1643 with Pascal's calculator. The device had rotary dials that rotated in accordance with the selected numbers; with gears, drums, and clever engineering, it was capable of addition, subtraction, multiplication and division (using 9's constant). A stylus was used to turn the dials. Later devices of this type include the Arithmometer, in the 1860s; and the Addiator, in 1920.  The Addiator was a pocket mechanical adding machine that used a stylus to move tiny rigid slices of sheet-metal that were enclosed in a case. On the side of a slice of metal there were numbers that became visible to display the result. It was capable of addition, subtraction, multiplication and division. In 1967 there was a HEXADAT model, which allowed 4-function math to be applied to hexadecimal numbers for use in programming. The first use of a stylus in an electronic computing device was the Stylator, demonstrated by Tom Dimond in 1957.

Types 
Different types of stylus are used for graphics tablets, as well as resistive and capacitive touchscreens. Capacitive screens are very widely used on smart phones and multi-touch surfaces, where simultaneous use of several fingers is detected; a stylus cannot replicate this.

Capacitive 
Capacitive (also called passive) styluses emulate a finger by using a tip made of rubber or conductive foam; or metal such as copper. They do not need to be powered and can be used on any multi-touch surface that a finger can be used, typically capacitive screens that are common in smart phones and tablet computers. Stylus tips made of rubber or foam are often large, making it rather difficult to get precise notes or drawings.

Capacitive styluses work by distorting the screen’s electrostatic field. Screens that receive input from a capacitive stylus (as well as human fingers) can't register pressure applied by the pen; tilting of the pen; and can't distinguish between a capacitive stylus, your finger, or a resting palm as input - it will register all of these touches as marks on the screen.

Capacitive styluses are made of a conductive material (typically as a metal rod or barrel) to transmit electrical charge between the hand and a rubber/foam or metal tip such as copper. Being free of any digital components, capacitive styluses can be cost effective to manufacture. DIY capacitive styluses can also be made with materials found at home.

Capacitive styluses tend to work on any multi-touch surface that accepts input from a finger.

Active 

Active (also called digital) styluses include digital components or circuitry inside the pen that communicates with a digitizer on the touch device. This communication allows for advanced features such as pressure sensitivity, tilt, programmable buttons, palm detection, eraser tips, memorizing settings, and writing data transmission. In order for an active stylus to function, its digital component protocol must match the digitizer technology in the touch screen it is interacting with. Active styluses are powered by a removable or chargeable battery, or operate passively by inductance.

Active styluses use different protocols by different manufacturers in order to communicate with the digitizer of a graphic tablet or multi-touch device. The digital protocol of the pen must match the device digitizer, otherwise input from the pen will not register on the device.

Common active stylus protocols are:

Microsoft Pen Protocol (MPP) (formerly N-trig)
 Wacom AES 1.0 and 2.0
 Wacom EMR
Universal Stylus Initiative (USI)
 Apple Pencil Active Projected Capacitive (APC)
Bluetooth

Examples of active styluses:
 Microsoft Surface Pen
 Samsung S-Pen
 Google Pixelbook Pen
 Apple Pencil

Performance 
A stylus' performance is measured by these four characteristics:

 Comfort
 Resistance
 Balance and weight
 Precision:
 Responsiveness & speed
 Jitter
 Tilt
 Levels of pressure
 Palm rejection or detection, which prevents a touch device from registering or marking the screen when a hand or palm is resting on the screen surface, relies on a combination of technology in the stylus, the OS software and the screen digitizer technology, to work effectively.

Comparison Characteristics of Smartphone Stylus Pens: 
A stylus' performance is measured by these four characteristics:

 Compatibility
 Dimensions
 Weight
 Precision:
 Pressure Sensitivity
 Tilt Support
 Battery Life
 Charging Mechanism
 Smartphone stylus pens have become a popular tool for smartphone users who want to take notes, draw, or create digital art on their device. A good stylus can make a huge difference in the precision and ease of use when interacting with a smartphone, especially for those who find it difficult to navigate the small touchscreen with their fingers.

Gallery

See also 
Apple Pencil
Handwriting recognition
Light pen
Pen computing

References

External links

 Annotated Bibliography of References to Pen Computing, Touchscreens, and Tablets
 

User interface techniques
Pointing devices
Computing input devices
American inventions